Roman Weidenfeller (born 6 August 1980) is a German former professional footballer who played as a goalkeeper for Bundesliga clubs 1. FC Kaiserslautern and Borussia Dortmund, as well as the Germany national team.

Weidenfeller spent 16 seasons with Dortmund and managed to win both the Bundesliga and DFB-Pokal twice. In 2014, he won the FIFA World Cup with Germany.

Club career

Early career
During his youth years, Weidenfeller played for Sportfreunde Eisbachtal. He then made his professional debut in 1997, after his performances at the 1997 FIFA U-17 World Championship.

Kaiserslautern
In 1998, Weidenfeller transferred to the 1. FC Kaiserslautern youth team and later was used in the second team. For the 2000–01 season he was promoted to the first team but made only six league appearances in two years.

Borussia Dortmund

Weidenfeller moved to Borussia Dortmund in 2002 on a free transfer as a possible replacement for Jens Lehmann, who had moved to Arsenal in 2003. Weidenfeller had reportedly been unhappy at Kaiserslautern, where he was used mainly as a backup to Georg Koch. His debut for Dortmund came on 17 December 2003 against his former club, Kaiserslautern, in a 1–0 loss.

In 2005, Weidenfeller underwent surgery following a meniscus tear in his left knee during training.

Early in the 2007–08 season, Weidenfeller was given a three match ban and fined €10,000 for racist insults leveled against Schalke 04 striker Gerald Asamoah. Asamoah originally reported Weidenfeller after a match on 18 August 2007 between the two clubs, where the incident occurred after a clash between the two in the 51st minute. Weidenfeller offered an apology to Asamoah following the news reports but denied making the statement.

Weidenfeller won the Bundesliga with Dortmund in 2011 and went on to win the Bundesliga and DFB-Pokal double with the club in 2012, saving a penalty taken by Arjen Robben in the Bundesliga-clinching match. In the DFB-Pokal final, he was substituted in the 33rd minute due to a collision with Mario Gómez.

On 6 May 2013, Weidenfeller signed a contract extension with Borussia Dortmund, keeping him at the club until 2016.

On 27 July 2013, Weidenfeller won the 2013 DFL-Supercup with Dortmund 4–2 against rivals Bayern Munich.

However, with manager Jürgen Klopp leaving at the end of the 2014/15 season, the replacement manager Thomas Tuchel chose new signing Roman Bürki as his first choice goalkeeper as Dortmund began the season in excellent form, winning their first eleven games under Tuchel. Weidenfeller continued to play in the club's European matches.

On 5 February 2016, Weidenfeller signed a new one-year deal with Dortmund, keeping him at the club until 2017. On 9 May 2017, he extended his contract until 2018. At the end of the 2017–18 season, he retired after making his final appearance as a substitute for Bürki, but announced that he would continue to work for Dortmund in another capacity. His farewell match took place on September 7, 2018 in the Signal Iduna Park where Roman & Friends won against the BVB All Stars and Weidenfeller scored two goals.

Following Weidenfeller's retirement, he remained at Borussia Dortmund as an international ambassador.

International career

In November 2013, Weidenfeller was called up to the German national squad for his first time for the friendlies against Italy and England. He received his first cap when he started against England at the Wembley Stadium on 19 November 2013, making him the oldest ever German goalkeeper débutant. He then appeared for the game against Cameroon, where the game ended tied at 2–2. He made his third appearance in the next game against Armenia where Germany won 6–1. Both games were international friendlies.

He was nominated as a reserve keeper behind Manuel Neuer for the 2014 FIFA World Cup in Brazil, where the German team won the title a fourth time, but Weidenfeller wasn't used in any match. Weidenfeller made his first appearance for the German national team in a competitive match against Gibraltar during the UEFA Euro 2016 qualifying in June 2015. His international farewell came with this match after winning five caps in total.

Career statistics

Club

1.Includes German Cup
2.Includes UEFA Champions League, UEFA Europa League, and UEFA Intertoto Cup
3.Includes German League Cup and German Super Cup

International
Source:

Honours
Borussia Dortmund
 Bundesliga: 2010–11, 2011–12
 DFB-Pokal: 2011–12, 2016–17
 DFL-Supercup: 2013
 UEFA Champions League runner-up: 2012–13
Germany U16

 UEFA European Under-16 Championship third place: 1997

Germany
 FIFA World Cup: 2014

References

External links

 
 
 
 
 
 Roman Weidenfeller football profile from Yahoo! Sports UK
 

1980 births
Living people
Association football goalkeepers
German footballers
Germany under-21 international footballers
Germany B international footballers
Borussia Dortmund players
1. FC Kaiserslautern players
1. FC Kaiserslautern II players
Bundesliga players
Germany international footballers
2014 FIFA World Cup players
FIFA World Cup-winning players
Borussia Dortmund non-playing staff